Himalayitidae is an extinct family of ammonites in the superfamily Perisphinctoidea. The family existed from the Tithonian of the Jurassic to the Berriasian of the Cretaceous. The family is thought to derive from Perisphinctidae.

References

External links 
 
 

Ammonitida families
Perisphinctoidea
Jurassic ammonites
Tithonian first appearances
Early Cretaceous extinctions